Digital Audio Control Protocol (DACP) is a protocol used by the iTunes and other audio player and server applications on Mac, Windows and Linux computers, enabling remote control by mobile devices such as iPhone and Android phones and tablet computers. By connecting the personal computer to loudspeakers the mobile device is used as a two-way remote control, allowing selection and control of music playback within a traditional listening environment such as a home or apartment.

Clients
Compliant DACP clients can connect to any DACP enabled server. Clients are available for multiple desktop and mobile platforms.

 Apple Remote  Apple Remote is the first DACP client created specifically for iTunes remote control.

 CuteRemote  CuteRemote DACP remote control for Nokia Phones.

 TunesRemote+  TunesRemote+ for Google Android is a fork of Jeff Sharkey's TunesRemote project. The project's goal is provide remote functionality for Android with similar capabilities as Apple's remote.

 TunesRemote-SE  TunesRemote-SE combines the DACP control software from TunesRemote+ with the graphical user interface from Firefly Client to produce an application that can control a DACP server from any computer running Java.

 Remote for iTunes  Remote for iTunes by Hyperfine Software for Android lets users control iTunes via their home Wi-Fi network.

 Remote for Windows Phone 7  Remote for Windows Phone 7 by Komodex Software lets users control DACP servers from their home Wi-Fi network.

 yTrack  yTrack is an iPad application developed by Fabrice Dewasmes that browses a remote DACP library and let users control it.

Servers
Compliant DACP servers can accept connections from any DACP client. Multiple compliant servers are available for Mac, Windows and Linux platforms.

 Apple iTunes  Apple iTunes is the original DACP server and the specification was created specifically for iTunes remote control.

 MonkeyTunes for MediaMonkey  In 2009 Melloware Inc., released MonkeyTunes, the first known "third-party" DACP server for MediaMonkey that is fully compliant with Apple's DACP protocol.

 TouchRemote for Foobar2000  In 2009 Wintense released TouchRemote, a plugin (component) for the foobar2000 music player, implementing a DACP server that is fully compliant with Apple's DACP protocol allowing Apple Inc.'s Remote application to be used.

 AlbumPlayer  In 2011 Albumon, released a DACP plugin for their software AlbumPlayer which is a full featured jukebox player for the PC.

 Telescope for Songbird  In 2010 Wilco released Telescope for the Songbird music player, implementing a DACP server that is fully compliant with Apple's DACP protocol, and a standard web service and mobile browser interface.

 Rhythmbox for Gnome  In 2010 native DACP support was added to Rhythmbox after a Google Summer of Code project by Alexandre Rosenfeld.

See also
 Digital Audio Access Protocol
 Remote Audio Output Protocol

References

External links
 Tunes Remote, Android client using DACP.
 TunesRemote+, forked version of TunesRemote for Android with updates and bug fixes
 TunesRemote-SE, DACP client for Java platforms
 Remote for iTunes by Hyperfine Software, Android client using DACP
 MonkeyTunes, MediaMonkey DACP server
 foo_touchremote Foobar2000 DACP server
 Telescope Songbird DACP server

Data transmission